Let's Have a Party is a 1953 ragtime medley by pianist Winifred Atwell. It entered the UK charts on 4 December 1953, spending nine weeks there and peaking at #2. It entered the charts again the following year, appearing on 26 November 1954 on the back of the success of Let's Have Another Party. This time, the single had a six-week run, and peaked at #14.

References

1953 singles
1954 singles
Rags
1950s instrumentals